Kimjŏngsuk County is a kun, or county, in Ryanggang province, North Korea, along the Yalu River. Originally part of Samsu, the county was made a separate entity in 1952. Formerly known as Sinpa, it was named in 1981 after Kim Jong-suk, the mother of Kim Jong-il.

The Sinpa Revolutionary Site there is associated with Kim Jong-suk's underground political activities there during the anti-Japanese struggle.

Geography
Kimjŏngsuk lies in the northern portion of the Kaema Plateau, and slopes downward toward the north. The Changjin River flows through the county, which is traversed by the Puksubaek Mountains and Huisaekbong Mountains.  The highest point is Huisaekbong itself, 2185 m. Some 92% of the county's area is forestland. The chief rivers are the Yalu and the Changjin.  The climate varies, with extremely cold temperatures prevailing in the south, and 3-3.5 ℃ warmer temperatures along the Yalu in the north.

Administrative divisions
Kimjŏngsuk county is divided into 1 ŭp (town), 2 rodongjagu (workers' districts) and 22 ri (villages):

Economy
The chief local industry is logging; there is little agriculture, except for some rice cultivation along the Yalu.  A certain amount of wheat, maize, soybeans, and potatoes are also produced. There are local deposits of molybdenum, gold, copper, silver, lead, zinc and tungsten.  Honeybees and other livestock are also raised. Hydropower is abundant.  Food processing dominates local manufacturing.

Transportation
The county is served by both road and rail, with the Pukbunaeryuk Line of the Korean State Railway passing through the county.

See also
Geography of North Korea
Administrative divisions of North Korea

References

External links

Counties of Ryanggang